Acleris nigropterana is a species of moth of the family Tortricidae. It is found in China (Xizang).

The wingspan is about 21.5 mm. The forewings are brownish black. The hindwings are greyish white. Adults have been recorded on wing in May.

References

Moths described in 1993
nigropterana
Moths of Asia